William Nicholas Hailmann (20 October 1836 Glarus, Switzerland – 13 May 1920 Pasadena, California) was an American educator. He was a progressive educator and helped introduce the kindergarten into the United States.

Biography
He was educated in the gymnasium at Zürich, studied in Medical College of Louisville, Kentucky, and received a Ph.D. from Ohio University in 1885. He taught natural science in the Louisville high schools from 1856 to 1865, and then directed the German and English Academy from 1865 to 1873, where he built the first kindergarten classroom in the United States.  He eventually became president of the Froebel Institute of North America.

From 1873 to 1878, he directed the German and English Academy in Milwaukee, Wisconsin, and then the German-American Seminary of Detroit, Michigan, from 1878 to 1883. He was superintendent of public schools of Laporte, Indiana, from 1883 to 1894. From 1894 to 1898 he superintended the Indian School Service of the United States and worked to hire more Native American teachers for the Service. He was superintendent of instruction in Dayton, Ohio from 1898 to 1903 and head of the department of psychology of the Chicago Normal School, 1904 to 1909. From 1909 to 1915, he was head of department of education at the Normal Training School, Cleveland, Ohio. He retired to Pasadena, California in 1915.

He was buried in Riverside Cemetery, North Reading, Massachusetts upon his death.

Works

Outlines of a System of Object-teaching (1866)
History of Pedagogy (1870)
Kindergarten Culture (1872)
The Law of Childhood (1878)
Primary Methods (1887)
Application of Psychology to Teaching (1887)
The English Language (1902)

He translated Froebel's Education of Man into English (1890), and edited Erziehungsblaetter (1870–83) and Kindergarten Messenger and New Education (1876–84). From 1883 to 1894, he was one of the chief contributors of the National Educators' Association in the interest of the kindergarten and other features of the new education.

Family
He married Eudora Lucas of Louisville on 24 December 1857. She was an associate in his efforts to introduce the kindergarten system to the United States.  She died in 1904, and he married Helena Kuhn of Detroit on 25 December 1907.

Notes

References
 
 
 Description at Froebel Foundation USA (accessed 18 February 2011)
 
 Biography at accessgenealogy.com whose source was The Book of Clevelanders, A Biographical Dictionary of Living Men of the City of Cleveland, Burrows Book Company, 1914 (accessed 18 February 2011)

1836 births
1920 deaths
Ohio University alumni
Chicago State University faculty
Swiss emigrants to the United States
School superintendents in Indiana